Guaranteed minimum income (GMI), also called minimum income (or mincome for short), is a social-welfare system that guarantees all citizens or families an income sufficient to live on, provided that certain eligibility conditions are met, typically: citizenship; a means test; and either availability to participate in the labor market, or willingness to perform community services.

The primary goal of a guaranteed minimum income is reduction of poverty. In circumstances when citizenship is the sole qualification, the program becomes a universal basic income system.

Elements
A system of guaranteed minimum income can consist of several elements, most notably:

 Calculation of the social minimum, usually below the minimum wage
 Social safety net that helps those without sufficient financial means survive at the social minimum through payments or a loan, generally conditional on availability for work, performance of community services, some kind of social contract, or commitment to a social integration trajectory
 State child support
 Student loan and grants
 State pensions for the elderly
 Disability pensions for those who physically can't work

Differences from basic income

Basic income means the provision of identical payments from a government to all of its citizens. Guaranteed minimum income is a system of payments (possibly only one) by a government to citizens who fail to meet one or more means tests. While most modern countries have some form of GMI, a basic income is rare.

History

Pre-modern antecedents
Persian monarch Cyrus the Great ( ca 590-ca 529 B.C.), whose government used a regulated minimum wage, also provided special rations to families when a child was born.

The Roman Republic and Empire offered the Cura Annonae, a regular distribution of free or subsidized grain or bread to poorer residents. The grain subsidy was first introduced by Gaius Gracchus in 123 B.C., then further institutionalized by Julius Caesar and Augustus Caesar.

The first Sunni Muslim Caliph Abu Bakr, who came to power in 632 C.E., introduced a guaranteed minimum standard of income, granting each man, woman and child ten dirhams annually. This was later increased to twenty dirhams.

Modern proposals
In 1795, American revolutionary Thomas Paine advocated a citizen's dividend to all United States citizens as compensation for "loss of his or her natural inheritance, by the introduction of the system of landed property" (Agrarian Justice, 1795).

French Emperor Napoleon Bonaparte echoed Paine's sentiments and commented that 'man is entitled by birthright to a share of the Earth's produce sufficient to fill the needs of his existence' (Herold, 1955).

The American economist Henry George advocated for a dividend paid to all citizens from the revenue generated by a land value tax.

American economist Milton Friedman began advocating a basic income in the form of a negative income tax in the early 1940’s. He discusses the proposal his 1962 book Capitalism and Freedom and his 1980 book Free to Choose.

In 1963, Robert Theobald published the book Free Men and Free Markets, in which he advocated a guaranteed minimum income (the origin of the modern version of the phrase).

In 1966, the Cloward–Piven strategy advocated "overloading" the US welfare system to force its collapse in the hopes that it would be replaced by "a guaranteed annual income and thus an end to poverty".

In his final book Where Do We Go from Here: Chaos or Community? (1967), Martin Luther King Jr. wrote

In 1968, James Tobin, Paul Samuelson, John Kenneth Galbraith and another 1,200 economists signed a document calling for the US Congress to introduce in that year a system of income guarantees and supplements.

In 1969, President Richard Nixon's Family Assistance Plan would have paid a minimum income to poor families. The proposal by Nixon passed in the House but never made it out of committee in the Senate.

In 1973, Daniel Patrick Moynihan wrote The Politics of a Guaranteed Income, in which he advocated the guaranteed minimum income and discussed Richard Nixon's Guaranteed Annual Income (GAI) proposal.

In 1987, New Zealand's Labour Finance Minister Roger Douglas announced a Guaranteed Minimum Family Income Scheme to accompany a new flat tax.  Both were quashed by then Prime Minister David Lange, who sacked Douglas.

In his 1994 "autobiographical dialog", classical liberal Friedrich Hayek stated: "I have always said that I am in favor of a minimum income for every person in the country".

In 2013, the Equal Life Foundation published the Living Income Guaranteed Proposal, illustrating a practical way to implement and fund a minimum guaranteed income.

In 2017, Harry A. Shamir (US) published the book Consumerism, or Capitalism Without Crises, in which the concept was promoted by another label, as a way to enable our civilization to survive in an era of automation and computerization and large scale unemployment.  The book also innovates a method to fund the process, tapping into the underground economy and volunteerism.

Other modern advocates include Ayşe Buğra (Turkey), The Green Economics Institute (GEI), and Andrew Coyne (Canada).

Funding

Tax revenues would fund the majority of GMI proposals. As most GMI proposals seek to create an earnings floor close to or above poverty lines amongst all citizens, the fiscal burden would require equally broad tax sources, such as income taxes or VATs. To varying degrees, a GMI might be funded through the reduction or elimination of other social security programs, such as unemployment insurance.

Another approach for funding is to acknowledge that all modern economies use fiat money and thus taxation is not necessary for funding. However, the fact that there are no financial constraints does not mean other constraints, such as on real resources, do not exist. A likely outcome based on the economic theory known as Modern Monetary Theory would be a moderate increase in taxation to ensure the extra income would not cause demand-pull inflation. This hypothetical Chartalist approach can be seen in the implementation of quantitative easing programs where, in the United States, over three trillion dollars were created without requiring taxes.

Examples around the world

Brazil 
Minimum income has been increasingly accepted by the Brazilian government. In 2004, President Lula da Silva signed into law a bill to establish a universal basic income. This law is primarily implemented through the Bolsa Família program. Under this program, poorer families receive a direct cash payment via a government issued debit card. Bolsa Família is a conditional cash transfer program, meaning that beneficiaries receive their aid if they accomplish certain actions. Families who receive the aid must put their children in school and participate in vaccination programs. If they do not meet these requirements, they are cut off from aid. The program has been criticised as vote-buying, trading productive individuals' earning for the votes of welfare recipients  As of 2011, approximately 50 million people, or a quarter of Brazil's population, were participating in Bolsa Família.

Canada 

Canada has experimented with minimum income trials. During the Mincome experiment in Manitoba in the 1970s, Mincome provided lower-income families with cash transfers to keep them out of poverty. The trial was eventually ended but this was due to budget shortfalls and a change in government. 

The province of Ontario began a minimum income experiment in 2017.  Approximately 4000 citizens began to receive a stipend based on their family situation and income. Recipients of this program could receive upwards of $10,000 per year. Government researchers used this pilot as a way of testing to see if a minimum income can help people meet their basic needs. On 31 August 2018, following a change in government, incoming Premier Doug Ford announced that the pilot would be cancelled at the end of the current fiscal year.

China
China's Minimum Livelihood Guarantee also called dibao, is a means-tested social assistance scheme introduced in 1993 and expanded to all Chinese cities in 1999.

Cyprus
In July 2013, the Cypriot government unveiled a plan to reform the welfare system in Cyprus and create a Guaranteed Minimum Income for all citizens.

Denmark 

Kontanthjælp (formerly known as bistandshjælp) is a public benefit in Denmark granted to citizens who would otherwise not be able to support themselves or their families. In principle, cash benefits are a universal right for all citizens who meet certain statutory criteria.

Estonia 

A subsistence allowance is financial help for a person or family in need, which provides minimal resources for everyday life (food, medicine, housing costs, etc.).

Finland 

Basic subsistence allowance paid by Kela may be granted to a person or family whose income and assets are insufficient to cover the necessary daily expenses.

France
In 1988, France was one of the first countries to implement a minimum income, called the Revenu minimum d'insertion. In 2009, it was turned into Revenu de solidarité active (RSA), a new system that aimed to solve the poverty trap by providing low-wage workers a complementary income to encourage activity.

Iceland 
Financial assistance (fjárhagsaðstoð) is for individuals and families who cannot support themselves and their livelihoods without assistance, with the aim of supporting people to help themselves and to be able to support themselves.

India
Modern independent India developed many means and livelihood tested cash transfer programs through Direct Benefit Transfer at both the federal and the state level. At the federal level, these include minimum income social pension programs such as National Social Assistance Scheme, guaranteed employment program like National Rural Employment Guarantee Act, 2005 or a disability aid like Deendayal Disabled Rehabilitation Scheme. At the state level, there can be additional minimum income programs, one such being "Laksmir Bhandar" run by the state of West Bengal that transfers a minimum aid to families without work in the state.

Ireland
In Ireland, €20 of earnings per day of permitted work (beneficiaries are allowed up to three days per week) is disregarded from employment income when calculating Jobseekers’ Allowance entitlement and deductions are calculated as 60 percent of earnings less this income disregard. In addition, the Part-time Job Incentive Scheme and Back to Work Family Dividend are fixed-duration payments offered to the long-term unemployed incentive moving into work. In return for relinquishing claims to primary assistance benefits, both schemes provide benefits for a fixed duration that are slightly lower than household GMI entitlements, but which are not tapered with employment income, subject to certain eligibility requirements. Ireland’s relatively generous tapering system serves to smooth disincentives to increase income and work and contributes to their lower measured participation tax rates (PTRs) and marginal effective tax rates (METRs).

Italy 
The citizens' income is a social welfare system created in Italy in January 2019. Although its name recalls one of a universal basic income, this provision is actually a form of conditional and non-individual guaranteed minimum income.

Netherlands

Norway 

Income support can be granted if the applicant has insufficient income and resources to live on and is not entitled to other social security benefits. Income support is paid by the Norwegian Labour and Welfare Administration.

Saudi Arabia 
Saudi Arabia has a Citizen’s Account Program which provides a basic income to registered citizens. In December 2017, immediately before the program began, more than 3.7 million households had registered, representing 13 million people, or more than half the population., between one fifth and one third of Saudi residents are estimated to be non-citizens.

Spain 

In Spain, the ingreso mínimo vital is an economic benefit guaranteed by the Social security in Spain in its modality no contributory. The IMV is defined as a "subjective right" and is intended to prevent poverty and social exclusion of people who live alone or integrated into a coexistence unit when they are in a situation of vulnerability due to lack of sufficient financial resources to cover their basic needs. The benefit, which is not fixed and varies depending on various factors, ranges between 462 and 1015 euros per month, is expected to cover 850,000 households (approximately 2.5 million people) and will cost the government 3 billion euros per year.

Sweden 

Social assistance consists partly of a "national standard" (riksnorm) and partly of "reasonable costs outside the national standard". The national standard includes costs such as food, clothing and footwear. Reasonable non-standard costs include rent and household electricity.

United States

The United States has multiple social programs that provide guaranteed minimum incomes for individuals meeting certain criteria such as assets or disability. For instance, Supplemental Security Income (SSI) is a United States government program that provides stipends to low-income people who are either aged (65 or older), blind, or disabled. SSI was created in 1974 to replace federal-state adult assistance programs that served the same purpose. Today the program provides benefits to approximately eight million Americans. Another such program is Social Security Disability Insurance (SSD or SSDI), a payroll tax-funded, federal insurance program.  It is managed by the Social Security Administration and is designed to provide income supplements to people who are restricted in their ability to work because of a disability, usually a physical disability. SSD can be supplied on either a temporary or permanent basis, usually directly correlated to whether the person's disability is temporary or permanent.

An early guaranteed minimum income program in the U.S. was the Aid to Families with Dependent Children (AFDC), established by the Social Security Act. Where previously the responsibility to assist needy children lay in the hands of the states, AFDC transferred that authority to the federal government. Over time, the AFDC was often criticized for creating disincentives to work, leading to many arguing for its replacement. In the 1970s, President Richard M. Nixon proposed the Family Assistance Program (FAP), which would replace the AFDC. FAP was intended to fix many of the problems of the AFDC, particularly the anti-work structure. Presidential nominee George McGovern also proposed a minimum income—in the form of a Universal Tax Credit. Ultimately, neither of these programs was implemented. Throughout the decade, many other experimental minimum income programs were carried out in cities throughout the country, such as the Seattle-Denver Income Maintenance Experiments. In 1996, under President Bill Clinton, the AFDC was replaced with the Temporary Assistance for Needy Families program. This would block grant funds to the states to allow them to decide how aid would be distributed.

Another guaranteed minimum income program in the U.S. is the Earned Income Tax Credit. This is a refundable tax credit that gives poorer families cash assistance every year. The EITC avoids the welfare trap by subsidizing income, rather than replacing it.

Other countries
 Romania

See also

 Constitutional economics
 Guaranteed Annual Income
 Guaranteed Income Supplement
 Guaranteed Minimum Pension
 Homelessness in the United States
 Job guarantee
 Living wage
 New Cuban Economy
 Social credit
 Social dividend
 Universal basic income
 Wage slavery

References

Further reading
 Coady, D., Shang, B., Jahan, S., & Matsumoto, R. (2021). Guaranteed minimum income schemes in Europe: Landscape and design. IMF Working Papers, 2021(179), 1. https://doi.org/10.5089/9781513584379.001 
Colombino, U. (2011). Five issues in the design of Income support mechanisms: The case of Italy, IZA Discussion Papers 6059, Institute for the Study of Labor (IZA).

External links
 Basic income for all-Philipp van Parijs, Boston Review
 "Social minimum" in the Stanford Encyclopedia of Philosophy
 Guaranteed Basic Income Studies: How it could be organised, Different Suggestions
 About a Guaranteed Basic Income: History
 "Guaranteed minimum income" in the Encyclopædia Britannica

Universal basic income
Minimum wage
Labor relations
Personal taxes
Social liberalism

ru:Гарантированный минимум